James Charles Greenwood (born May 4, 1951) is an American politician in the Republican Party.  He represented Pennsylvania's Eighth Congressional District for six terms in the United States House of Representatives.

Greenwood became president and CEO of the Biotechnology Innovation Organization (BIO) in 2004.

Personal life
Greenwood was born in Philadelphia, Pennsylvania, and grew up in Holland, Pennsylvania. He graduated from Dickinson College with a B.A. in sociology in 1973, served as an aide to state representative John S. Renninger and as a houseparent for children with intellectual disabilities and emotional disorders. From 1977 until 1980, he was a caseworker for the Bucks County Children and Youth Social Service Agency, working with abused and neglected children.

He and his wife, Tina, have four children.

Political career
Greenwood served as a Republican member of the Pennsylvania House of Representatives for the 143rd district from 1981 to 1986 and the Pennsylvania Senate for the 10th district from 1987 to 1992.  In 1992, Greenwood defeated Democratic Congressman Peter H. Kostmayer for a seat in the U.S. House of Representatives representing Pennsylvania's 8th district.

As a centrist with libertarian views on social issues and conservative stances on taxes and economic issues, Greenwood's overall voting record was moderate. He was known as an effective legislator. He voted against two of the four impeachment charges against President Bill Clinton in 1998, and sided with the House Democrats to oppose Partial-Birth Abortion Ban Act in 2003. He also served on the House Energy and Commerce Committee and was Chairman of the Subcommittee on Oversight and Investigations. In this role, he led investigations and held hearings on a variety of issues within the vast jurisdiction of the Committee including corporate governance, bioterrorism, port and border security, drug importation, and the safety of nuclear power plants.

A co-founder and co-chair of the House Oceans Caucus, Greenwood was the author of comprehensive, bipartisan legislation to preserve, protect, and research ocean resources. He also worked to increase communication among world leaders to address international environmental issues. As a member of the Education and Workforce Committee, he was a leading voice in the efforts to ensure that sufficient federal funds were appropriated to meet the needs of children in special education programs and to prevent school violence.

Greenwood announced in the midst of the 2004 congressional election that he would not seek re-election and retire. He had already won the 8th district's Republican primary, and his abrupt withdrawal raised many questions. Greenwood released a statement saying: "From time to time during my twenty four years of public service, I have been approached and offered other types of challenges and opportunities. Such has been the case in the last few days, and I am currently reviewing one of these opportunities. I will make my decision public in the very near future and will have no other statement until then." Bucks County Commissioner Mike Fitzpatrick was selected as the new Republican nominee in a special party convention, and went on to win the general election.

After serving six terms in Congress, Greenwood was appointed President and CEO of the Biotechnology Innovation Organization (BIO), a biotechnology trade association based in Washington, DC.

After politics

Greenwood was the president and CEO of the Biotechnology Innovation Organization (BIO) from 2005 to 2020. BIO represents more than 1,200 biotechnology companies, academic institutions, state biotechnology centers, and related organizations across the United States and in more than 30 other nations. BIO members are involved in the research and development of healthcare, agriculture, industrial and environmental biotechnology products.

In addition to his work with BIO, Greenwood is a member of the Blue Ribbon Study Panel on Biodefense, a group that advocates and encourages changes to U.S. policy to make national biodefense systems stronger. In order to address biological threats facing the nation, the Blue Ribbon Study Panel on Biodefense created a 33-step initiative for the U.S. Government to implement. Headed by former senator Joe Lieberman and former governor Tom Ridge, the study panel assembled in Washington, D.C., for four meetings concerning current biodefense programs. The study panel concluded that the federal government had little to no defense mechanisms in case of a biological event. The Study Panel's final report, The National Blueprint for Biodefense, proposes a string of solutions and recommendations for the U.S. Government to take, including items such as giving the vice president authority over biodefense responsibilities and merging the entire biodefense budget. These solutions represent the panel's call to action in order to increase awareness and activity for pandemic related issues.

Greenwood is a member of the USA Science and Engineering Festival's advisory board. Greenwood is also a member of Marine Conservation Biology Institute's board of directors. In 2014, Greenwood joined the board of directors of the National Audubon Society. Additionally, he is a member of the ReFormers Caucus of Issue One.

Electoral history

Write-in and minor candidate notes:  In 1996, write-ins received 12 votes.  In 1998, Natural Law candidate Carolyn Boyce received 1,022 votes and write-ins received 15 votes.  In 2002, write-ins received 34 votes.

References

External links

 

 
  – official U.S. House website
 Interview with James C. Greenwood Discussing the issues and opportunities for the Biotechnology industry on PharmaTelevision (May 2007).

|-

|-

|-

1951 births
Living people
20th-century American politicians
21st-century American politicians
American nonprofit businesspeople
American nonprofit executives
American Presbyterians
American social workers
Dickinson College alumni
Republican Party members of the Pennsylvania House of Representatives
Republican Party Pennsylvania state senators
People from Bucks County, Pennsylvania
Politicians from Philadelphia
Republican Party members of the United States House of Representatives from Pennsylvania